William Campbell, D.Sc., Ph.D., M.A. (1876–1936) was an English metallurgist, born at Newcastle on Tyne, England. He graduated from the Durham College of Science of Durham University in 1898, and from Columbia University (Ph.D., 1903). He lectured on geology and metallurgy at Durham, and on geology at Columbia University where he became full professor of metallurgy in 1917.  

During 1907-1911, he was metallographer to the United States Geodetic Survey. He worked at the Bureau of Mines and lectured at the United States Naval Academy. During World War I, he served with the National Research Council.

English metallurgists
Academics of Durham University
1876 births
1936 deaths
Scientists from Newcastle upon Tyne
English emigrants to the United States
Columbia University faculty
Columbia University alumni
Alumni of Armstrong College, Durham